Death from a Distance is a 1935 American mystery film directed by Frank R. Strayer and starring Russell Hopton, Lola Lane and George F. Marion. The film's sets were designed by the art director Edward C. Jewell.

It was the first feature film broadcast on U.S. commercial television, on July 2, 1941, during the first week of official commercial broadcasts on NBC's New York television station WNBT-TV.

Plot summary
While a distinguished astronomer is giving a lecture in a planetarium, a shot rings out and one of the audience member is found dead. A tough detective and a brassy female reporter lock horns as they both try to break the case.

Cast
Russell Hopton as Det. Lt. Ted Mallory
Lola Lane as Kay Palmer
George F. Marion as Jim Gray
Lee Kohlmar as Prof. Ernst Einfeld
John St. Polis as Prof. Trowbridge
Lew Kelly as Det. Regan
E.H. Calvert as District Attorney
Wheeler Oakman as Langsdale, aka George Fremont
Robert Frazer as Morgan
Cornelius Keefe as Clay Gorman
John Davidson as Ahmad Haidru
John Dilson as Newspaper Editor McConnell
Herb Vigran as the Police Photographer

External links

 "Happy Birthday, TV" Variety, July 1, 2011 http://www.variety.com/article/VR1118039380

1935 films
American detective films
American mystery films
American black-and-white films
Films directed by Frank R. Strayer
Chesterfield Pictures films
1935 mystery films
1930s English-language films
1930s American films